David Novák (born 11 January 1979) is a retired Czech football player who played in the Czech First League for FC Viktoria Plzeň.

References

External links
 

1979 births
Living people
Czech footballers
Czech Republic youth international footballers
Czech Republic under-21 international footballers
Association football defenders
Czech First League players
FC Viktoria Plzeň players